Ecce Homo is a painting by the Renaissance painter Andrea Mantegna. It is conserved at Musée Jacquemart-André in Paris.
It depicts the presentation of Jesus Christ crowned with thorns.

Characters 
Besides Jesus, five people are represented: two on the left, one on the right, and two behind. The person on the left is supposed to be a Jew, and the one on the right in a turban, an old woman.

Text 
In the painting, two messages can be seen in Latin script: Crvcifige evm[.] tolle evm[.] crvcifige crvc[...] ("crucify him, trap him, crucify [in the cross]") to the left and to the right the similar Crvcifige evm crvcifige tolle eṽ crvcifige ("crucify him, crucify, trap him, crucify"). The text on the left pretends to be pseudo-Hebrew in cursive script.

References 

1500s paintings
Paintings by Andrea Mantegna
Mantegna
Paintings in the collection of the Musée Jacquemart-André